While there are many homosexual athletes in both professional and college level sports, there are also many athletes who are struggling with their sexual identity. These athletes are often afraid to come out as homosexual because of the strict rules and regulations, and as well as how they will be treated by their teammates. Also included in this group are the coaches of these teams. They may worry that if they come out, that the punishment would lead to them not being allowed to play on a team. Homosexual coaches may also fear the loss of recruitments, the lack of acceptance from their players, and the lack of job security due to coming out to their team. The coaches also may feel that they are role models for the players also facing the challenges of coming out to their peers, because if the coaches suppress their sexuality, the players may feel that they should do the same.

Homosexual college athletes

Jesse Taylor 
Jesse Taylor is a basketball player at Dakota Wesleyan University. He is South Dakota's first openly gay college level basketball player. As a Catholic, young, small-town boy, Taylor was taught that being homosexual was a sin and witnessed how the LGBT community was poorly treated. He has recalled how he also became homophobic while growing up, to overcome his homosexual feelings, and to avoid giving his peers the impression that he was gay. Taylor dedicated hard work to basketball, football, and track as ways to suppress what he was hiding. "For most people, these sound like great high school experiences and accomplishments, but none of those accomplishments made me feel that great about myself. Breaking a record didn't cover up the fact that I couldn't accept who I was." Taylor went through many personal struggles that kept him thinking that he would never come out to anyone, and go on to marry a woman, until, "Toward the end of my freshman year I realized that I was never going to fall in love with a girl. For the first time in my life... I was ok with that. I knew my attractions to men were natural, and there was nothing I could do about it. For the first time in my life, I wasn't ashamed. This was just another unique thing about me that doesn't define Jesse." After first coming out to his sister, Taylor then came out to his parents, then family and friends, and has stated that all their reactions were positive. The next group of people Taylor had to tell was his teammates. He has said that all their reactions were positive. "Before coming out to anyone on the team, I was trapped in my own thoughts. I was constantly worried about what my teammates would think. I was never able to fully focus in practice or games; there was always the constant fear in the back of my mind that someone on the team might find out. I thought my teammates would treat me differently and think less of me."

Homosexual college coaches 
Many coaches are homosexual as well. They often struggle with the idea of coming out, in fear of losing their job as well as losing the respect of their players. Sherri Murrell, an openly gay former coach of the Portland State Vikings women's basketball team, stated that other gay coaches are hesitant to come out because "There's the fear that your program will be adversely affected, that you won't be accepted by your bosses and boosters, that it will hurt recruiting." Other coaches also realize that when parents of potential players know that the head coach is gay, they perceive the whole team as being gay. Minnesota's former head coach, Shannon Miller, was not asked to return as the head coach of the team even after she had won five national championships. She thinks that the reason her contract wasn't renewed was because of her "gender and sexual orientation."

Chris Burns is an assistant coach for the Bryant University men's basketball team. He is the first openly gay Division I coach in both men's and women's basketball. He revealed to his team that he was gay and received positive feedback from all members. He explained that his main goal in coming out is to encourage others: "To me, it’s a huge step in the right direction for our sport because it can allow others who don’t feel like they can be who they are to do the same.” After coming out, his players gained a new trust for Burns because they felt that there could come to him for anything now that he had opened up to them.

Helen Carroll, sports director of the National Center for Lesbian Rights, makef a point about homosexual coaches: "If you're a lesbian coach, you're thinking, 'I better keep my mouth shut so I can get a job or keep a job.' Then that sends a negative message to student-athletes that it's a dangerous thing to be out as gay."

References 

Sexual orientation and sports
University and college sports